Marmaduke Alington (September 1671 – 1749), of Swinhope, Lincolnshire. and Broxbourne, Hertfordshire, was a British lawyer and Tory  politician who sat in the House of Commons from 1728 to 1734.

Alington was the eldest son of Henry Alington of Swinhope and his wife Elizabeth Gamble, daughter of William Gamble (AKA Bowyear) of Leytonstone, Essex. He was educated at Merchant Taylors' School from 1683 to 1687 and succeeded his father  in 1690. He was admitted at Lincoln's Inn in 1693 and was called to the bar in 1708.

Alington was appointed Recorder of Hertford in 1714 and became a  bencher of his Inn in 1724. He was family lawyer to the Drakes of Shardeloes, and was returned on their interest  as a Tory Member of Parliament for Amersham at a by-election on 16 May 1728. The only vote he is known to have cast  was against the Excise Bill in 1733. He did not stand again at the  1734 British general election.

Alington died unmarried on 5 September 1749.

References

1671 births
1749 deaths
Members of the Parliament of Great Britain for English constituencies
British MPs 1727–1734